In the run-up to the 2021 Scottish Parliament election, various organisations conducted opinion polls to gauge voting intentions. Results of such polls are displayed in this list. Most of the pollsters listed were members of the British Polling Council (BPC) and abided by its disclosure rules.

The date range for these opinion polls is from the previous Scottish Parliament election, held on 5 May 2016, to the 2021 election, held on 6 May 2021.

Graphical summary 
This graph shows opinion poll results with trendlines for the 30-day moving averages. The SNP led in all polls, with the Conservatives and Labour coming second or third behind them.

Key
 SNP – Scottish National Party
 Conservative – Scottish Conservatives
 Labour – Scottish Labour
 Lib Dem – Scottish Liberal Democrats
 Green – Scottish Greens
 UKIP – UK Independence Party
 Reform – Reform UK
 SSP – Scottish Socialist Party
 Alba – Alba Party
 AFU – All for Unity

Constituency vote 
The opinion polls below are gauge voting intentions for the 73 single member constituency seats elected through the plurality voting system.

Graphical summary

Poll results

Regional vote 
The opinion polls below are gauge voting intentions for the 56 regional list seats elected through the additional member system.

Graphical summary

Poll results

Methodology 
Each polling organisation are members of the British Polling Council and uses slightly different methodology in their collection of data. All organisations remove voters who do not give a voting intention from their headline figures; this is usually ranges from 10% to 15% of respondents likely to vote. A brief description of each company's methods is as follows:
Panelbase collects its data via an online panel, with results weighted to be demographically representative of the voting age population in terms of age, sex, and country of birth, previous general election vote and independence referendum vote. Additionally, the voting intention data is weighted by how likely respondents were to vote.
Survation collects data from its online panel, with the results weighted to the profile of all Scottish adults of voting age in terms of age, sex, region, previous general election vote, previous Scottish Parliament election constituency vote, EU membership referendum vote and independence referendum vote. Responses for voting intention were additionally weighted by likelihood to vote in the election. The data for the 3–5 October 2018 poll for the Scottish National Party was collected via telephone, instead of the online panel.
YouGov collects its data through an online survey of its panel, and weights its respondents to be representative of the voting age population as a whole in terms of age by gender by education level (such as Male aged between 25 and 49 with a high level of education), social grades, previous general election vote, independence referendum vote, the respondents' political attention and birthplace (Scotland, elsewhere in the United Kingdom and outside the UK). Additionally, the headline voting intention data is weighted by how likely respondents said they were to vote and whether they voted at the previous general election.

See also 
Opinion polling for the next United Kingdom general election
Opinion polling for the 2021 Senedd election
Opinion polling for the 2022 Northern Ireland Assembly election
Opinion polling for the 2016 Scottish Parliament election
Opinion polling on Scottish independence

Notes

Footnotes

References 

Scotland 2021
Opinion polling for Scottish Parliament elections
Opinion polling for United Kingdom votes in the 2020s